German submarine U-241 was a Type VIIC U-boat of Nazi Germany's Kriegsmarine during World War II. Four days into her first patrol, she shot down an attacking flying boat but was sunk with all hands the next day.

Design
German Type VIIC submarines were preceded by the shorter Type VIIB submarines. U-241 had a displacement of  when at the surface and  while submerged. She had two shafts and two  propellers.

U-241 was fitted with five  torpedo tubes (four fitted at the bow and one at the stern), fourteen torpedoes, one  SK C/35 naval gun, (220 rounds), one  Flak M42 and two twin  C/30 anti-aircraft guns. The boat had a complement of between forty-four and sixty.

Service history
An order was placed for U-241 on 10 April 1941 and construction began on 4 September 1942 at Germaniawerft, Kiel, as yard number 675. She was launched the following year on 25 June 1943 and commissioned under the command of Oberleutnant zur See Arno Werr a month later on 24 July.

U-241 began training with the 5th U-boat Flotilla on 24 July 1943, the day that the U-boat was commissioned . U-241 remained with the 5th U-boat Flotilla until 31 March 1944, when her training was complete.

U-241 began the first and only patrol of her career on 1 April 1944. She was assigned as a front (operational) boat to the 3rd U-boat Flotilla and left her original home port of Kiel on 23 April of that year. She arrived in Kristiansand in occupied Norway the next day, on 24 April. On 30 April, U-241 left Kristiansand for her new home port of Bergen, which she arrived at on 4 May 1944. On 13 May, U-241 left Norway for the North Sea.

On 17 May, just four days after leaving port, the boat came under attack from a Norwegian Catalina flying boat from No. 333 Squadron RAF. The incident occurred at 22:21 about 125 miles west of Ålesund, Norway. Anti-aircraft fire from the submarine hit the aircraft during its attack run and caused the Catalina's depth charges to miss their intended target. One of the AA gunners also managed to shoot a large hole in the hull of the aircraft. Although the plane was able to return to Britain the pilot was forced to make an emergency landing in the River Tay in Scotland before he could reach his base at Woodhaven, Fife. During the landing the plane suffered damage beyond all possible repair and the pilot was forced to beach it.

Although U-241 defended herself on that occasion, she was attacked with depth charges by another Catalina, this time from 210 Squadron, the following day. This resulted in the sinking of the submarine with the loss of all 51 crew members.

Disputed fate
According to a book Steuermann durch Krieg und Frieden ('Helmsman through War and Peace') by Hans Schmid, the author and two other men survived the sinking, were rescued and taken prisoner. All sources for 'uboat.net' state that there were no survivors.

References

Bibliography

External links

German Type VIIC submarines
U-boats commissioned in 1943
U-boats sunk in 1944
World War II shipwrecks in the Norwegian Sea
World War II submarines of Germany
1943 ships
Ships built in Kiel
U-boats sunk by British aircraft
U-boats sunk by depth charges
Ships lost with all hands